Treo 700 may refer to the Palm smartphone:

Treo 700p
Treo 700w
Treo 700wx